Hamrick is a surname. Notable people with the surname include:

Charley Hamrick, American football player
Chris Hamrick (born 1966), American professional wrestler
John Hamrick (1876–1956), American businessman
Mike Hamrick, American athletic director
Ray Hamrick (1921–2009), American baseball player
Samuel J. Hamrick (1929–2008), American writer